B. spectabilis may refer to:

Barkeria spectabilis, an orchid species
Bledius spectabilis, a beetle species
Boerlagella spectabilis, a flowering plant species
Bougainvillea spectabilis, a flowering plant species
Bowenia spectabilis, a cycad species
Brachychiton spectabilis, a tree species
Buccochromis spectabilis, a fish species
Bucculatrix spectabilis, a moth species
Burchia spectabilis, a sea snail species